The Ukrainian People's Army, also known as the Ukrainian National Army (UNA) or by the derogatory term Petliurivtsi, was the army of the Ukrainian People's Republic (1917–1921). They were often quickly reorganized units of the former Imperial Russian Army or newly formed volunteer detachments that later joined the national armed forces. The army lacked a certain degree of uniformity, adequate leadership to keep discipline and morale. Unlike the Ukrainian Galician Army, the Ukrainian People's Army did not manage to evolve a solid organizational structure, and consisted mostly of volunteer units, not regulars.

History

Creation: Military congresses
When the Tsentralna Rada (Central Rada) came to power in Ukraine in spring of 1917, it was forced to promptly put together an army to defend Ukraine against the Bolsheviks. Nearly all units of the newly created army were detached from the Imperial Russian Army. On March 29, 1917 the first organization of military forum the Ukrainian Military Club was organized at the Kiev Military District on the initiative of Mykola Mikhnovsky. Also during 1917 there were three All-Ukrainian Military Congresses that elected their representatives to the Central Rada. After the first such congress that took place on May 18–21, 1917 in Kiev, the Ukrainian General Military Committee was created. The committee was placed in charge for creation and restructuring of the army. The head of the committee was elected the future first General Secretary of Military Affairs, Symon Petlyura.

The next congress, defying a ban placed by the Russian Provisional Government, took place on June 18–23, 1917 in Kiev. At this congress the 1st "Universal" of the Central Rada was read and the first elections to that institution took place. The last congress took place on November 2–12, 1917 and also in Kiev. Due to the civil unrest that was initiated by the Bolsheviks across the country also known as the October Revolution the congress took longer than its predecessors as it was interrupted for a few days in order to create the first Ukrainian Regiment for the Defense of Revolution (headed by Colonel Yuri Kapkan). The main requests of the congress were proclamation of the Ukrainian Democratic Republic, full Ukrainization of army and navy, and an immediate peace treaty.

At the time, the Central Rada did not see the need for a standing army, reinforced by conscription. Instead, a 'Free Cossack' concept (which was no different from a militia) was introduced and ratified in November 1917. Only when the Bolsheviks invaded the Ukrainian People's Republic, in December 1917, was the need for a regular standing army appreciated. The new organization was to include; eight infantry corps and four cavalry divisions. But these plans were never realized, as the Rada was overthrown in a coup led by Pavlo Skoropadsky, who brought the Hetmanate to power in Ukraine. A temporary peace treaty with the Bolsheviks was also signed on 12 June 1918.

After taking power, the Hetmanate government established its own plans for a standing army. These were to consist of 310,000 military personnel divided into eight territorial corps, with an annual budget of 1,254 million karbovantsi. However, this army did not develop beyond the organizational stage, due to many dissident movements and gross unpopularity of the Hetmanate amongst peasants and civilians. In November 1918, the Directorate came to power in Ukraine, bringing with it yet another vision for the structure of the army. During this time, most units simply crossed from the Hetmanate to the Directorate with little organizational change occurring.

War of Independence

The Bolsheviks first invaded the Ukrainian People's Republic in January 1918. After several weeks of battle, the Red Army overwhelmed the fairly small Ukrainian force, and took Kiev on February 9. This forced the Central Rada to seek help from the Central powers of World War I. After signing the Treaty of Brest-Litovsk, the Ukrainian Army was to receive assistance in fighting the Red Army. A German-Austrian Operation Faustschlag offensive removed the Bolsheviks from Kiev in early March, and the Rada government returned to the capital. In April, the Red Army was forced to completely retreat from Ukraine, and a peace treaty was signed. The German/Austro-Hungarian victories in Ukraine were due to the apathy of the locals and the inferior fighting skills of Bolsheviks troops compared to their Austro-Hungarian and German counterparts.

In December 1918, after the Directorate's coming to power, the army reached its peak at an estimated 100,000 recruits. These armed forces proved to be neither battleworthy nor well-organized. At the time most of Pavlo Skoropadskyi's Ukrainian State forces changed sides and joined the Directory.

In January 1919, Ukraine declared war on Soviet Russia, after the latter established a provisional government in Kharkiv, proclaiming the Ukrainian Soviet Socialist Republic. Simultaneously, the West Ukrainian People's Republic had taken Lviv, thereby beginning a war with the Second Polish Republic. In January 1919, the Ukrainian People's Army and the Ukrainian Galician Army united, after the West Ukrainian People's Republic had been completely occupied by Polish forces, and Kiev by Soviet forces. Symon Petlyura became the commander in chief of the new Ukrainian Army; this improved the order and discipline in the army. Special inspectors with wide authority were introduced, similar to Bolshevik commissars. The army grew as 35,000 soldiers of central Ukraine were joined by 50,000 Galicians. Having this force, the army of the UNR launched a successful raid on Kiev and Odessa in August 1919. But eventually the united armies suffered severe casualties in their suicidal war against the Polish army, Denikin's Whites and the Bolsheviks. An epidemic of spotted fever contributed to this defeat. Therefore, Ukraine signed an armistice with the Entente and later with Poland in May 1919.

After failing to capture Kiev on their own, the Ukrainian army signed the Treaty of Warsaw with Poland, in April 1920. Under the treaty, Ukrainian forces fought side by side with Polish forces against Soviet Russia and other Ukrainian 'Red' movements (Denikin, the Germans and the Entente had long since been expelled from Ukraine). Following a decisive failure in the Kiev Offensive, Ukrainian presence only decreased in the seesaw Polish-Soviet war. Until finally the newly founded Soviet Union and Poland signed the Treaty of Riga on March 18, 1921, ending the war. The small remnants of the Ukrainian People's army either resorted to Guerrilla warfare or joined the Polish Army.

Structure
The headquarters of the Ukrainian Armed forces was called the General Bulawa.
The original structure of the army, as designated by the Tsentralna Rada, planned to organize an optimistic eight infantry corps and four cavalry divisions. But these plans were never realized due to the internal struggle for power in Ukraine. Instead, the army was hastily formed of various armed volunteer units and "Free Cossacks". But in May 1919 (long after the Directorate assumed power), the Ukrainian people's army was forced to reorganize after its manpower dropped from 100,000 to 15,000 in just five months of warfare with Soviet Russia. According to then Ukrainian politician Volodymyr Vynnychenko, this dramatic decrease in manpower occurred mainly because of communist propaganda. The new, semi-organized structure was made up of five brigade-sized "army groups" and a large number of Free Cossacks:
Sich Riflemen, which were disbanded in late 1919 (5,000 servicemen)
Zaporizhtsy group (3,000 servicemen)
Volynska group (4,000 servicemen)
Udovychenko's regiment (1,200 servicemen)
Tutunnyka's group (1,500)

In May 1920 in the middle of the Polish-Soviet War, the army was once again forced to reorganize, after its strength more than doubled in size. The new structure included: six infantry and one cavalry division. Each infantry division was to have three brigades armed with artillery, a cavalry regiment and an engineer regiment. The single cavalry division had six mounted regiments. The formation of six reserve brigades was also attempted, but this was only partially successful. The reinforcement brigades were later made into an under strength, two brigade machine gun division. Thus, the structure was, as follows:
1st Infantry Zaporizhska Division
2nd Infantry Volynska Division
3rd Infantry Zalizna Division
4th Infantry Kyivska Division
5th Infantry Khersonska Division
6th Sich Rifle Division
1st Machine Gun Division
1st Cavalry Division

Ranks and insignia

Following the reformation that took place among the Ukrainian military units the older Russian rank structure and insignia were dropped and replaced with those of the Hetmanate times. Most notable is the introduction of the rank of Otaman that replaced the General ranks of the Russian army. The army headquarters became known as the General Bulawa. The military representative in the Directorate of Ukraine, Symon Petliura was given the rank of the Chief Otaman. The new position was introduced by the former Russian General and later Otaman Oleksander Hrekov.

Ranks (in descending order) since end of 1917:
General ranks
Otaman Frontu
Otaman Armii
Otaman Korpusu
Otaman Divizii
Otaman Brihady (Brigadier general)
Other officers
Polkovnyk (Colonel)
Osavul (Lieutenant colonel)
Kurinny (Major)
Sotnyk (Captain)
Pivsotenny (Lieutenant)
Enlisted
Bunchuzhny (Company Sergeant)
Chotar (Platoon Sergeant)
Royovyi (Sergeant)
Kozak (see Cossacks)

Ranks have altered in June 1918, but only for officers:
General (Heneral)
Heneralnyi Bunchuzhnyi (General)
Heneralnyi Znachkovyi (Lieutenant general)
Heneralnyi Khorunzhyi (Major general)

non-General
Polkovnyk (Colonel)
Viyskova Starshyna (Lieutenant colonel)
Sotnyk (Captain)
Znachkovyi (Lieutenant)
Khorunzhyi (2 Lieutenant)

Main military formations (UPR)
 1st Ukrainian Corps, former 34th Russian Corps
 2nd Sich Zaporozhian Corps, former 6th Russian Corps
 Kurin of Sich Riflemen (not to be confused with the Austrian military formation of Ukrainian Sich Riflemen), formed out of the Austrian prisoners of war interned in Russian concentration camps
 Cavalry Regiment of Sich Riflemen
 Khmelnytsky Cossack Regiment (Bohdanivtsi)
 Polubotko Cossack Regiment (Polubotkivtsi)
 Zaporizhian Corps
 1st Zaporizhian Infantry Regiment (Hetman Doroshenko IR)
 2nd Zaporizhian Infantry Regiment
 3rd Zaporizhian Infantry Regiment (Hetman Khmelnytsky IR)
 3rd Haidamaka Infantry Regiment
 1st Zaporizhian Regiment of Haidamaka Cavalry (Kosh Hordienko Cavalry)
 1st Zaporizhian Engineer Regiment
 1st Zaporizhian Artillery Regiment
 1st Zaporizhian Auto-Armor Division
 Cavalry-Mountainous Artillery Division
 Zaporizhian Air-Floating Squadron
  (1 Cavalry Regiment of Black Zaporizhians)
 Free Cossacks
 Ukrainian Steppe Division (Anti-Bolshevik revolutionary-military unit)
 Ukrainian Marines
 1st Hutsul Marines Regiment
 2nd Hutsul Marines Regiment
 3rd Marines Regiment
  (Gray-Coats)
 
 
 Black Haidamaka Kurin
 Red Haidamaka Kurin
 3rd Iron Riflemen Division
 Sich Riflemen Light Artillery Regiment
 Don Cossack Regiment (mounted)
 20th Pavlohrad Cavalry Regiment
 6th Sich Division (former 2nd Division)
 Kiev Insurgent Division of Yu.Tyutyunyk
 Ukrainian Navy
 Ukrainian People's Republic Air Fleet

Main military formations (WUPR)
 Ukrainian Galician Army
 1 Galician Corps
 2 Galician Corps
 3 Galician Corps

List of generals

 Lieutenant (Poruchik) General Borys Bobrovskyi (1868 – 1918), Major General of the former Imperial Russian Army
 Lieutenant General Nikolai Bredov (1873 – 1945), Lieutenant General of the former Imperial Russian Army (brief period in 1918)
 Lieutenant (Poruchik) General Serhiy Diadiusha (1870 – 1933), Major General of the former Imperial Russian Army
 Lieutenant (Poruchik) General Fedir Kolodiy (1872 – 1920), Major General of the former Imperial Russian Army
 Lieutenant (Poruchik) General Pavlo Kudriavtsev (1873 – 1921), Lieutenant Colonel (Voyskovoy Starshina) of the former Imperial Russian Army
 Lieutenant (Poruchik) General Mykola Koval-Medzvetskyi (1868 – 1929), Major General of the former Imperial Russian Army
 Lieutenant (Poruchik) General Antin Maslinyi (1865 – 1929), Major General of the former Imperial Russian Army
 Lieutenant (Poruchik) General Oleksandr Mykhailiv (1868 – ????), Major General of the former Imperial Russian Army
 Lieutenant (Poruchik) General Nikolai Volodchenko (1862 – 1945), Lieutenant General of the former Imperial Russian Army
 Lieutenant (Poruchik) General Oleksandr Vyshnivskyi (1890 – 1975), Sub-Lieutenant (Podporuchik) of the former Imperial Russian Army
 Lieutenant (Poruchik/Znachkovy) General Petro Yeroshevych (1870 – 1945), Major General of the former Imperial Russian Army
 Colonel (Polkovnyk) General Sergei Delvig (1866 – 1944), Lieutenant General of the former Imperial Russian Army
 Colonel (Polkovnyk) General Oleksiy Galkin (1866 – 1941), Lieutenant General of the former Imperial Russian Army
 Colonel (Polkovnyk) General Mykhailo Omelianovych-Pavlenko (1878 – 1952), Colonel of the former Imperial Russian Army
 Colonel (Polkovnyk) General Pavlo Shandruk (1889 – 1979), Sub-Lieutenant (Podporuchik) of the former Imperial Russian Army
 Colonel (Polkovnyk) General Oleksandr Udovychenko (1887 – 1975), Stabskapitän of the former Imperial Russian Army
 Colonel (Polkovnyk) General Andriy Vovk (1882 – 1969), Sub-Lieutenant (Podporuchik) of the former Imperial Russian Army
 Colonel (Polkovnyk) General Mykola Yunakiv (1871 – 1931), Lieutenant General of the former Imperial Russian Army
 Colonel (Polkovnyk) General Oleksandr Zahrodskyi (1889 – 1968), Stabskapitän of the former Imperial Russian Army
 Colonel (Polkovnyk) General Viktor Zelinskyi (1864 – 1940), Major General of the former Imperial Russian Army
 Full (Bunchuzhny) General Alexander Ragoza (originally Oleksandr Rohoza; 1858 – 1919), General of the Infantry of the former Imperial Russian Army (in 1918)

See also
Russian Civil War
Sotnia
Ukrainian Death Triangle
Ukrainian Sich Riflemen

References

External links
 Ukrainian Encyclopedia 
 Ukrainian Armies 1914-55 By Peter Abbott, Oleksiy Rudenko (google books) 

Military history of Ukraine
Military units and formations of Ukraine
Disbanded armies
Military units and formations established in 1917
Military units and formations disestablished in 1921
Ukrainian People's Republic
Ukrainian military formations